The 2014–15 Baltic Basketball League was the 11th season of the Baltic Basketball League.

This season’s competition included 8 teams from Estonia, 6 each from Latvia and Lithuania, and one team apiece representing Finland and Russia. For the regular season the teams were divided into three groups and competed in a round-robin competition system, with each team facing their opponent twice. Top four teams of each group and the best fifth placed team qualified for the eight-finals. The three teams who participated in FIBA EuroChallenge and Eurocup competitions – Šiauliai, Tartu Ülikool/Rock and Ventspils – begin their journey at the start of the play-offs, seeded respectively first, second and third based on last season’s results. All play-off games were played in home-and-away series.

In the Finals Lithuanian team Šiauliai defended their title by beating Latvian side Ventspils 156–150 on aggregate score. Third place belonged to Lithuanian side Juventus who beat Estonian team Tartu Ülikool/Rock with aggregate score of 125–123.

Teams

Team information

Regular season
The four best teams in each group and the best 5th placed team, which will be determined by place in the group; higher goal difference of all games in the group; higher number of goals in all games in the group, not accounting the games against the team placed 7th, will qualify for the 8th-finals.Source: Changes in the BBL Regulations concerning the qualification for the Eighth-Finals

On 5 January 2015, Dynamo Moscow released an official statement announcing that the team will withdraw from the Baltic Basketball League, citing complicated economic situations and a tight match schedule. Results of all games played by Dynamo Moscow were nullified.Source: Dynamo Moscow pull out from BBL

Group A

Group B

Group C

Playoffs

Bracket

Player statistics
Players qualify to this category by having at least 50% games played.
Source: Baltic Basketball League player statistics (2014–15)

Points

Assists

Rebounds

Efficiency

Awards

MVP of the Month
{| class="wikitable" style="text-align: center;"
! align="center"|Month
! align="center" width=170|Player
! align="center" width=170|Team
! align="center" width=|Ref.
|-
|October 2014||align="left"| Kristers Zeidaks ||align="left"| TYCO Rapla || 
|-
|November 2014||align="left"| Rolands Freimanis ||align="left"| Kalev/Cramo || 
|-
|December 2014||align="left"| Ronaldas Rutkauskas ||align="left"| Pärnu ||  
|-
|January 2015||align="left"| Laimonas Kisielius ||align="left"| Pieno žvaigždės || 
|-
|February 2015||align="left"| Evaldas Kairys ||align="left"| Pieno žvaigždės ||

References

External links
 

Baltic Basketball League seasons
2014–15 in European basketball leagues
2014–15 in Lithuanian basketball
2014–15 in Estonian basketball
2014–15 in Latvian basketball
2014–15 in Russian basketball
2014–15 in Finnish basketball